Suman Ranganathan or Ranganath is an Indian model and actress. She has starred in Kannada, Bengali, Tamil, Telugu, Malayalam and Hindi films.

Personal life
Suman Ranganathan was born in Tumakuru, Karnataka.

She was married to Bunty Walia, an Indian film producer. The couple split in 2007. 
She married Sajan Chinnappa, a businessman from Kodugu district, Karnataka on 3 June 2019

Career
She made her acting debut with the Kannada movie C.B.I. Shankar (1989) along with Shankar Nag. After the success of that movie, she starred in various movies like Bala Hombale (1989), Doctor Krishna (1989) Santha Shishunala Sharifa (1990) and Nammoora Hammera (1990).

In the year 1990, she made her Tamil debut with Pudhu Paattu. Then, she has acted in many Tamil movies like Perum Pulli (1991), Maanagara Kaaval (1991), Kurumbukkaran (1991), Unnai Vaazhthi Paadugiren (1992), Mettupatti Mirasu (1994) and Mudhal Udhayam (1995).

She appeared in Fareb (1996), her first Bollywood film, which was an Indian adaptation of Unlawful Entry. She appeared as an Indian-American socialite in Aa Ab Laut Chalen (1999). In 2003 she appeared in Baghban. The same year,  Suman claimed that she had been impersonated by a body double in some shots of the film Ek Stree.

Ranganath was also in a team of judges for the Mr India World 2007. She is the judge of Kannada reality show Thakadimitha, which airs on Colors Kannada.

After that part of the time, she was completely into acting in the Kannada industries. Post the long break, she acted back in the Tamil industry as a comeback in the movie Arrambam (2013). Making a comeback to Tamil nearly after 18 years, Suman essays the role of a tough journalist.

Suman Ranganathan acted in many successful projects, and she contributed to the success of many movies such as Neer Dose (2016) and Kavaludaari (2019).

Filmography

References

External links

Actresses from Bangalore
Living people
Kannada actresses
Actresses in Kannada cinema
Indian film actresses
Tamil actresses
Filmfare Awards South winners
20th-century Indian actresses
21st-century Indian actresses
Actresses in Telugu cinema
Actresses in Hindi cinema
Actresses in Tamil cinema
Female models from Bangalore
Actresses in Malayalam cinema
Year of birth missing (living people)